Carl Alan Manda (November 16, 1886 – March 9, 1983) was a second baseman in Major League Baseball, who played in nine games for the Chicago White Sox in 1914. At the time of his death, he was the oldest living former major league player.

References

External links

1886 births
1983 deaths
Major League Baseball second basemen
Chicago White Sox players
Baseball players from Kansas
Lyons Lions players
Fort Wayne Billikens players
Zanesville Potters players
Decatur Commodores players
Oakland Oaks (baseball) players
Fort Worth Panthers players
Memphis Chickasaws players
Calgary Bronchos players
Wichita Witches players
People from Rice County, Kansas
People from Artesia, New Mexico